Anthidium abjunctum is a species of bee in the family Megachilidae, the leaf-cutter, carder, or mason bees.

Distribution
This species of Megachilidae can be found in mid or central Africa.

References

abjunctum
Insects described in 1936